Deutsche Mathematik (German Mathematics) was a mathematics journal founded in 1936 by Ludwig Bieberbach and Theodor Vahlen. Vahlen was publisher on behalf of the German Research Foundation (DFG), and Bieberbach was chief editor. In February 1936, the journal was declared the official organ of the German Student Union (DSt) by its Reichsführer, and all local DSt mathematics departments were requested to subscribe and actively contribute. In the 1940s, issues appeared increasingly delayed and bunched; the journal ended with a triple issue (due Dec 1942) in June 1944.
 
Deutsche Mathematik is also the name of a movement closely associated with the journal whose aim was to promote "German mathematics" and eliminate "Jewish influence" in mathematics, similar to the Deutsche Physik movement. As well as articles on mathematics, the journal published propaganda articles giving the Nazi viewpoint on the relation between mathematics and race (though these political articles mostly disappeared after the first two volumes). As a result of this many mathematics libraries outside Germany did not subscribe to it, so copies of the journal can be hard to find. This caused some problems in Teichmüller theory, as Oswald Teichmüller published several of his foundational papers in the journal.

References

Further reading

 The title page, the table of contents, and some article pages of the journal's volume 1, issue 2 (1936) are linked from the blog Mathematicians are human beings (scientopia.org, 19 Sep 2011).

Mathematics journals
Politics of science
Science in Nazi Germany
Publications established in 1936
Publications disestablished in 1944
1936 establishments in Germany
1944 disestablishments in Germany
Mathematics in Germany
Nazi works